Wiele  is a village in the administrative district of Gmina Karsin, within Kościerzyna County, Pomeranian Voivodeship, in north-central Poland.

References

Wiele